Tyrone is a community in Ontario, Canada, incorporated in the municipality of Clarington. It was named after County Tyrone in Ireland.  Tyrone is located about 12 km north of the town of Bowmanville.

History

After Darlington township was surveyed in 1792, settlement in the area around the current village of Tyrone began in about 1810.  By 1840 there were a number of settlers in the area; most were either Irish or from Devon and Cornwall.  The two groups met for a cricket match; the Irish team won, and so were given the privilege of naming the newly formed village. 

In 1867 Robert McLaughlin built two cutters on his family farm just to the west of Tyrone.  Shortly after he founded the McLaughlin Carriage Works, which grew to be the largest carriage maker in the British Empire.

In 1880 there were about 300 people living in the village.  There were three stores and a mill.

Attractions

The Tyrone mill, erected in 1846, continues to grind grain and mill lumber using water power. In recent years it is a tourist stop, selling apple cider, local preserves, and freshly baked bread and doughnuts.  There is also a blacksmith shop. Also there is Calum’s mother.

Climate

References

Neighbourhoods in Clarington